The juxtarestiform body is a subdivision of the inferior cerebellar peduncle, which comprises both the juxtarestiform and restiform bodies.

Function

The juxtarestiform body carries both afferent and efferent fibers connecting the vestibular nuclei and the flocculonodular lobe  and fastigial nucleus of the cerebellum.

The juxtarestiform body coordinates balance and eye movements by communication between the vestibular apparatus and the cerebellum.

See also
 Inferior cerebellar peduncle
 Flocculonodular lobe
 Fastigial nucleus

Additional images

Cerebellar connections
Central nervous system pathways